Karen Poulsen (10 May 1881 – 15 February 1953) was a Danish stage and film actress. She married Valdemar Lund in 1902 and in 1919 she married Bjørn Thalbitzer.

Filmography

External links

Danish stage actresses
Danish film actresses
Danish silent film actresses
20th-century Danish actresses
1881 births
1953 deaths